Ivy Claire Pochoda (born January 22, 1977) is an American novelist and former professional squash player. Pochoda grew up in Brooklyn, New York, where she attended Saint Ann's School. She currently lives in Los Angeles.

Education
Pochoda holds a BA from Harvard College (1998) in Classical Greek and English and American Literature. She also received an MFA in 2011 from Bennington College in Fiction. She was the 2009 James Merrill House Writer in Residence.

Writing
Her first novel, The Art of Disappearing was published in 2009 by St. Martin's Press. Her second novel, Visitation Street was published by Ecco, a publishing imprint of HarperCollins, in July 2013. Visitation Street is only the second title chosen by Dennis Lehane for his eponymous imprint. Sceptre, an imprint of Hodder & Stoughton, will publish Visitation Street in the United Kingdom. Wonder Valley was published by Ecco in 2017.

Squash
Pochoda played squash professionally between 1998 and 2007, representing the United States during her career. She reached a career-high world ranking of 38th in March 1999, having joined Women's International Squash Players Association full-time in 1998. In her college career at Harvard University, Pochoda was individual national champion in 1998, and led Harvard to national championships in all four of her years on the team. She was also named Ivy League Rookie of the Year, Player of the Year, and was a four-time All-American and First Team all-Ivy. In May 2013, she was inducted into the Harvard Hall of Fame.

Works

Books 
 The Art of Disappearing (2009)
 Visitation Street (2013)
 Wonder Valley (2017) 
 Epoca ~ The Tree of Ecrof (2019)
 These Women (2020)

Articles

References

External links
 2013 Interview with Ivy Pochoda in The Los Angeles Times
 2013 Interview with Ivy Pochoda in LA Weekly
 2013 Interview with Ivy Pochoda in the Kansas City Star
 2009 Interview with Ivy Pochoda in Vanity Fair
 
 
 

1977 births
Living people
Writers from Brooklyn
Harvard Crimson women's squash players
American female squash players
21st-century American novelists
American women novelists
21st-century American women writers
Novelists from New York (state)
Harvard College alumni
Bennington College alumni
Saint Ann's School (Brooklyn) alumni